Spanish Green is a hamlet in the village of Stratfield Turgis, Hampshire, England.

External links

Villages in Hampshire